Maurício Pereira Barros (born 4 February 1944), known as Mura, is a Brazilian former footballer who competed in the 1964 Summer Olympics.

References

1944 births
Living people
Association football defenders
Brazilian footballers
Olympic footballers of Brazil
Footballers at the 1964 Summer Olympics
Botafogo de Futebol e Regatas players